The 2021 Porsche Tennis Grand Prix was a women's tennis tournament played on indoor clay courts. It was the 43rd edition of the Porsche Tennis Grand Prix and was classified as a WTA 500 tournament on the 2021 WTA Tour. It was held at the Porsche Arena in Stuttgart, Germany from 19 to 25 April 2021.

Ashleigh Barty won both the singles title and doubles title (alongside partner Jennifer Brady). The feat earned Barty her 11th career WTA Tour singles title and made her the first reigning world No. 1 to win the singles tournament since Justine Henin in 2007. By winning her 12th career WTA Tour doubles title, she also became the first player to sweep both tournaments since Lindsay Davenport in 2001. It was Brady's maiden career WTA Tour doubles title.

Champions

Singles 

  Ashleigh Barty def.  Aryna Sabalenka, 3–6, 6–0, 6–3.

Doubles 

  Ashleigh Barty /  Jennifer Brady def.  Desirae Krawczyk /  Bethanie Mattek-Sands, 6–4, 5–7, [10–5].

Points and prize money

Point distribution

Prize money

Singles main draw entrants

Seeds

1 Rankings are as of 12 April 2021.

Other entrants
The following player received a wildcard into the main draw:
  Andrea Petkovic

The following players received entry from the qualifying draw:
  Mona Barthel
  Ulrikke Eikeri
  Anna-Lena Friedsam 
  Julia Middendorf
  Nastasja Schunk 
  Stefanie Vögele

The following players received entry as lucky losers:
  Ekaterine Gorgodze
  Tamara Korpatsch

Withdrawals 
Before the tournament
  Victoria Azarenka → replaced by  Zhang Shuai
  Kiki Bertens → replaced by  Ekaterine Gorgodze
  Johanna Konta → replaced by  Ekaterina Alexandrova
  Elena Rybakina → replaced by  Tamara Korpatsch
  Iga Świątek → replaced by  Angelique Kerber

Doubles main draw entrants

Seeds

1 Rankings as of 12 April 2021.

Other entrants
The following pair received a wildcard into the main draw:
   Julia Middendorf /  Noma Noha Akugue

The following pair received entry using a protected ranking:
  Oksana Kalashnikova /  Alla Kudryavtseva

Withdrawals
Before the tournament
  Chan Hao-ching /  Latisha Chan → replaced by  Mona Barthel /  Anna-Lena Friedsam
  Ellen Perez /  Storm Sanders → replaced by  Ulrikke Eikeri /  Ekaterine Gorgodze

References

External links
 

Porsche Tennis Grand Prix
Porsche Tennis Grand Prix
Porsche Tennis Grand Prix
2020s in Baden-Württemberg
Porsche Tennis Grand Prix
Porsch